The Canton of Acheux-en-Amiénois  is a former canton situated in the department of the Somme and in the former Picardy region of northern France. It was disbanded following the French canton reorganisation which came into effect in March 2015. It consisted of 26 communes, which joined the canton of Albert in 2015. It had 6,373 inhabitants (2012).

Geography 
The canton is organised around the commune of Acheux-en-Amiénois in the arrondissement of Amiens. The altitude varies from 63m at Toutencourt to 157m at Authie for an average of 129m.

The canton comprised 26 communes:

Acheux-en-Amiénois
Arquèves
Authie
Bayencourt
Bertrancourt
Bus-lès-Artois
Coigneux
Colincamps
Courcelles-au-Bois
Englebelmer
Forceville
Harponville
Hédauville
Hérissart
Léalvillers
Louvencourt
Mailly-Maillet
Marieux
Puchevillers
Raincheval
Saint-Léger-lès-Authie
Senlis-le-Sec
Thièvres
Toutencourt
Varennes
Vauchelles-lès-Authie

Population

See also
 Arrondissements of the Somme department
 Cantons of the Somme department
 Communes of the Somme department

References

Acheux-en-Amienois
2015 disestablishments in France
States and territories disestablished in 2015